Dominic Andrew Heale (born 15 June 1961) is an English journalist and newsreader formerly employed by the BBC. He co-presented the flagship 6:30 Regional News programme East Midlands Today with Anne Davies, he also presented the lunchtime news.

Early life
Heale is from Devon, and attended the University of Hull.

Broadcasting career
Heale started working for Plymouth Sound Radio in 1984 before joining Devonair Radio in Exeter, later taking the role of news editor. He then joined Television South-West as a presenter in 1987, leaving in 1993 to work for Central News (East) in Nottingham, first as a reporter then presenter of Central News at Six. In 2000 he joined BBC East Midlands Today as a lead presenter, alongside Anne Davies.

On 19 October 2020, BBC East Midlands Today announced Heale was leaving his position after 20 years with his final broadcast taking place on 23 October 2020.

References

External links
 
East Midlands Today

1961 births
People from Kingston upon Thames
People from Nottingham
Living people
English male journalists
BBC newsreaders and journalists